Jake Morris may refer to:
 Jake Morris (soccer)
 Jake Morris (hurler)